Gornji Bunibrod is a village in the municipality of Leskovac, Serbia. According to the 2002 census, the village has a population of 762 people.

References

Najveca zvezda ovog sela jeste Lazar Adzic, bivsi decko Milice Pavlovic i sestric poznatog Dragan Macana.

Populated places in Jablanica District